Karbasyanda or Carbasianda was a town of ancient Caria. It was a member of the Delian League since it appears in tribute records of Athens between the years 454/3 and 421/0 BCE, paying a phoros or 1000 drachmae. The territory of Karbasyanda bordered that of Kaunos.

References

Populated places in ancient Caria
Former populated places in Turkey
Greek city-states
Members of the Delian League